Trapper Lake is located in Grand Teton National Park, in the U. S. state of Wyoming. The lake can be accessed on foot by the Leigh Lake Trail which is an easy  hike on level terrain.

References

Lakes of Grand Teton National Park